The 67th Golden Globe Awards was telecasted live from the Beverly Hilton Hotel in Beverly Hills, California on Sunday, January 17, 2010 by NBC, from 5:00 PM – 8:00 PM (PST) and 8:00 PM – 11:00 PM (EST) (1:00 – 4:00; Monday, January 18 UTC). The ceremonies were hosted by Ricky Gervais, and were broadcast live for the first time.

Nominations were announced on December 15, 2009. Among films, Up in the Air led with six nominations, followed by Nine with five and Avatar and Inglourious Basterds with four each. Matt Damon, Sandra Bullock, Meryl Streep, and Anna Paquin were each nominated twice; Damon as Best Actor – Comedy and Best Supporting Actor – Motion Picture; Bullock as Best Actress in both the Comedy and Drama categories; Streep competing against herself as Best Actress in the Comedy category; and Paquin as Best Actress – TV Series Drama and as Best Actress – Miniseries or TV Film. Television programs receiving multiple nominations include Glee, Dexter, Damages, Mad Men, House, and 30 Rock.

Avatar, Up and Crazy Heart were the leading movies, with each winning two awards. Avatar won awards for Best Motion Picture – Drama and Best Director; Up for Best Animated Feature Film and Best Original Score; and Crazy Heart for Best Actor – Drama and Best Original Song.

Martin Scorsese was presented with the Cecil B. DeMille Award for lifetime achievement in motion pictures.

Winners and nominees

These are the nominees for the 67th Golden Globe Awards. Winners are listed at the top of each list.

Film

Television

Awards breakdown
The following films and programs received multiple nominations:

Films

Television 

The following films and programs received multiple wins:

Films

Television

Ceremony

Presenters 

 Amy Adams
 Christina Aguilera
 Jennifer Aniston
 Justin Bartha
 Kristen Bell
 Halle Berry
 Josh Brolin
 Gerard Butler
 Cher
 Bradley Cooper
 Chace Crawford
 Robert De Niro
 Cameron Diaz
 Leonardo DiCaprio
 Colin Farrell
 Harrison Ford
 Jodie Foster
 Matthew Fox
 Jennifer Garner
 Mel Gibson
 Lauren Graham
 Tom Hanks
 Sally Hawkins
 Ed Helms
 Kate Hudson
 Felicity Huffman
 Samuel L. Jackson
 Nicole Kidman
 Jane Krakowski
 Taylor Lautner
 Zachary Levi
 Sophia Loren
 Paul McCartney
 Helen Mirren
 Jim Parsons
 Amy Poehler
 Julia Roberts
 Mickey Rourke
 Zoe Saldana
 Arnold Schwarzenegger
 Mike Tyson
 Sofia Vergara
 Olivia Wilde
 Kate Winslet
 Reese Witherspoon
 Sam Worthington

Cecil B. DeMille Award 
Martin Scorsese

Miss Golden Globe 
Mavis Spencer (daughter of Alfre Woodard & Roderick M. Spencer)

Ratings
The original telecast on both east and west coast drew an averaged of 17 million viewers overall and garnered 5.4 ratings share among 18–49 years old demographic. The averaged viewers was up 14% and it gained a 12% rise among 18–49 demographic rating share versus last year telecast. The '67th Golden Globe' telecast of NBC presents the network its biggest non-sports viewership in the Sunday slot in six years.

See also

 Hollywood Foreign Press Association
 82nd Academy Awards
 62nd Primetime Emmy Awards
 61st Primetime Emmy Awards
 16th Screen Actors Guild Awards
 63rd British Academy Film Awards
 30th Golden Raspberry Awards
 64th Tony Awards
 2009 in film
 2009 in American television

References

External links

067
2009 film awards
2009 television awards
2009 awards in the United States
January 2010 events in the United States
Beverly Hills, California
2010 in California